Great Pond is a 50 ha saline coastal lagoon on the south-eastern shoreline of the island of Saint Croix in the United States Virgin Islands.

Description
The lagoon is separated from Great Pond Bay on its southern side by a vegetated baymouth bar about 1,100 m long, with a maximum width of 105 m. It connects with the sea by a narrow channel at its south-eastern corner. The perimeter of the lagoon is vegetated with black mangroves, and extensive mudflats are exposed when water levels are low. The salinity of the water in the lagoon varies between 20 and 40 parts per thousand, depending on rainfall and groundwater runoff in the 470 ha catchment. There is a small settlement of about 100 houses in the watershed of the lagoon, mainly on its north-eastern side.

Important Bird Area
A 64 ha area, encompassing the lagoon and its immediate wetland surrounds, has been recognised as an Important Bird Area (IBA) by BirdLife International because it supports populations of white-crowned pigeons, green-throated caribs, Antillean crested hummingbirds and Caribbean elaenias, as well as a breeding colony of least terns.

References

Populated places in Saint Croix, U.S. Virgin Islands
Bodies of water of the United States Virgin Islands
Important Bird Areas of the United States Virgin Islands